Buildings, sites, districts, and objects in Virginia listed on the National Register of Historic Places:

Current listings by county and independent city

The following are approximate tallies of current listings by county and independent city. These counts are based on entries in the National Register Information Database as of April 24, 2008 and new weekly listings posted since then on the National Register of Historic Places web site. There are frequent additions to the listings and occasional delistings and the counts here are approximate and not official. The counts in this table exclude boundary increase and decrease listings which modify the area covered by an existing property or district and which carry a separate National Register reference number.

Gallery

See also

 Association for the Preservation of Virginia Antiquities
 List of historic houses in Virginia
 List of National Historic Landmarks in Virginia
 List of bridges on the National Register of Historic Places in Virginia
 Virginia Landmarks Register

References

 
 
Historic sites in Virginia
Virginia